This is a list of historic places in Eastman Region, Manitoba entered on the Canadian Register of Historic Places, whether they are federal, provincial, or municipal.

List of historic places

See also
 List of historic places in Manitoba
 List of National Historic Sites of Canada in Manitoba

Eastman Region
Eastman Region